Dino Lee (born Lee Yu-hsi on 31 March 1993), also known as Lee Yuk-Sai, is a Taiwanese singer, composer, musician and actor. He is known for his role as Ouyang Feifan in the 2015 film Our Times.

Social Media

Filmography

Television series

Movies

Discography

References 

1993 births
Living people
Taiwanese male film actors
21st-century Taiwanese male actors
21st-century Taiwanese  male singers